Pamela Kyle Crossley (born 18 November 1955) is a historian of modern China, northern Asia, and global history and is the Charles and Elfriede Collis Professor of History, Dartmouth College. She is a founding appointment of the Dartmouth Society of Fellows.

She is author of The Wobbling Pivot: China since 1800: An Interpretive History (2010), as well as influential studies of the Qing dynasty (1644–1911) and leading textbooks in global history. Crossley is known for an interpretation of the source of twentieth-century identities. In her view overland conquest by the great empires of early modern Eurasia produced a special form of rulership which gave high priority to the institutionalization of cultural identity. Crossley suggests that these concepts were encoded in political practice and academic discourse on "nationalism," and prevailed till the end of the twentieth century.

Biography
Crossley was born in Lima, Ohio, and attended high school in Emmaus, Pennsylvania. After leaving high school she worked as an editorial assistant and writer on environmental subjects for Rodale Press. In 1977 she graduated from Swarthmore College, where she was editor-in-chief of The Phoenix; her fellow students included David C. Page, Robert Zoellick, Ben Brantley, Wing Thye Woo, Robert P. George, Jacqueline Carey and David G. Bradley. At Swarthmore she was a student of Lillian M. Li and Bruce Cumings, and as an undergraduate began graduate study at the University of Pennsylvania with Hilary Conroy. She later entered Yale University, where she was a student of Yu Ying-shih and Parker Po-fei Huang, and wrote a dissertation under the direction of Jonathan D. Spence. She joined the Dartmouth College faculty in Hanover, New Hampshire, in 1985. After David Farquhar, Gertraude Roth Li, and Beatrice S. Bartlett, Crossley was among the first scholars writing in English to use Manchu-language documents to research the history of the Qing Empire. More specialists subsequently adopted this practice. Crossley is a Guggenheim fellow, an NEH fellow (2011–2012) and a recipient of the Association for Asian Studies Joseph Levenson Book Prize for A Translucent Mirror. Dartmouth students have given her the Goldstein Prize for teaching. Crossley resides in Norwich, Vermont.

Publications

Most recently Crossley has published The Wobbling Pivot: China Since 1800, An Interpretive History which takes the resilience and coherence of local communities in China as a theme for interpreting the transition from the late imperial to the modern era. Crossley's previous books are What is Global History? (Polity Press, 2008), an examination of narrative strategies in global history that joins a new series of short introductory books inspired by E.H. Carr's What is History?. Crossley's books on Chinese history include  Orphan Warriors: Three Manchu Generations and the End of the Qing World (Princeton University Press, 1990); The Manchus (Blackwells Publishers, 1997); A Translucent Mirror: History and Identity in Qing Imperial Ideology (University of California Press, 1999). She is also a co-author of the best-selling global history textbooks, The Earth and its Peoples (Houghton Mifflin, 5th edition, 2009; 6th edition, 2014) and Global Society: The World since 1900 (Houghton Mifflin, 2nd edition, 2007; 3rd edition, 2012). Her work has appeared in two separate series of the Cambridge histories. She is widely published both in academic journals and in periodicals such as London Review of Books, Wall Street Journal, The New York Times Literary Supplement, The New Republic, Royal Academy Magazine, Far Eastern Economic Review, Calliope, and in the online editorial spaces of the BBC. She has participated in A&E's "In Search of..." series ("The Forbidden City"). In January 2012 the new educational platform The Faculty Project announced that Crossley would produce a video course on Modern China for their site. Unusually, Crossley maintains an errata page for her publications, including exchanges with translators.

"Qing Studies," "New Qing History" and criticism by Chinese Academy of Social Sciences

Crossley is noted for her work in what has been called either New Qing History or Qing Studies, which has come under attack by Chinese scholars associated with the Chinese Academy of Social Sciences. Crossley pointed out that Manchu language, religion, documents, and customs remained of great importance to the Qing until the middle nineteenth century. Her book Orphan Warriors was the first to develop a sustained critique of conventional assumptions of "sinicization." She agreed that assimilation and acculturation were part of China's history, but considered "sinicization" to be something that historians had imbued with a charismatic quality with no basis in fact. She disagreed with earlier scholars that Manchus had been "sinicized", but she did not argue that Manchu culture in modern China was the traditional culture of Manchuria. Rather, it was a new culture of individual Manchu communities in China, what she called "the sense of difference that has no outward sign".

Many historians such as Joanna Waley-Cohen have named Crossley as related to the "New Qing History" school. William T. Rowe of Johns Hopkins University describes Crossley as the "pioneer" of these new ways of thinking about Qing history. Earlier, political commentator Charles Horner pointed to Crossley as one of the most important current historians in the reconceptualization of the Qing period and its significance, which he did not refer to as "New Qing History.".

In publications in Korea and China since 2008 Crossley has written that there are two trends that are often conflated, one a "Manchu-centered" school and another group who view the Qing empire as a "historical object" in its own right (not only a phase in Chinese history). She criticized the "Manchu-centered" school for romanticism and relying on disproved theories about "Altaic" language, culture and history.  She also argued that the analyses used by the group called "New Qing Historians" by Waley-Cohen and later popular with Chinese historians were various and conflicting, and that "New Qing History" as a "school" could not reasonably be extended beyond the small group who actually called themselves writers of "New Qing History." On the other hand, she seems to have included herself in the Qing empire school, which she calls "Qing Studies." She sees the Qing empire not as a Manchu empire but as a "simultaneous" system (like many other historical empires) in which the emperor is not subordinate to any single culture.

Of Crossley's books, only What is Global History? has been successfully translated and published in China. On April 20, 2015, the Chinese Academy of Social Sciences published a criticism by historian Li Zhiting of historians he called a "New Qing History" faction, accusing former Association for Asian Studies President  Evelyn Rawski, Crossley, Mark C. Elliott and James A. Millward personally as being apologists for imperialism, producing fraudulent history and encouraging "splittism" in border areas. This followed Internet criticism by Chinese posters of Crossley's 2011 editorial in the Wall Street Journal, in which she contrasted the international foundations of the 1911 revolution in China with the narrow nationalism of the hundred-year celebration in 2011.  Possibly Li Zhiting used some criticisms that Crossley herself had written in a 2008 essay which was translated into both Korean and Chinese in 2009 and 2010. The criticisms by Li were followed by an interview with associate professor Zhong Han (Minzu University) in the same CASS online journal, severely attacking  both Crossley's methodologies and her interpretations. In a subsequent essay Zhong continued his attack on Crossley, citing errors in an article of hers that had been translated into Chinese. Crossley maintains a voluminous errata site linked to her faculty page since 1995; in a tweet, she pointed out that Zhong had missed the "good stuff" and recommended that he visit the page. Subsequently, Liu Wenpeng denounced the concept of "Inner Asia" as used by "New Qing" historians, apparently following Crossley's 2009 discussion of the history of the Inner Asian term. Criticism of Crossley, Rawski and "New Qing" historians, particularly Elliott and Millward, continues in the Chinese press, possibly reinforcing campaigns against "Western culture" encouraged by the current Chinese government. Crossley was quoted in Kyodo New Service as saying, "We are not the targets," and that Chinese historians using non-Chinese documents and dealing with the history of Qing empire conquests were the real targets.

Global history

Crossley was a co-author of The Earth and its Peoples, which was a revolutionary text in 1997. She was invited to write What is Global History? in a Polity Press series of short texts introducing historical genres to undergraduates. It is a study of "narrative strategies" used by historians from many cultures, over history, to attempt to tell "a story without a center,"  which Crossley regards as the defining quality of "global history." In her own research work in the field of world or global history Crossley is known primarily for arguing, in agreement with a certain number of other historians of China, that not only material but also cultural and political trends produced an "early modern" period across Eurasia from about 1500 to about 1800. She has commented that while a Eurasian chronology that could be used for teaching is possible (as in the example of early modernity), it is not "global" since it would bring together Chinese and European history but isolate the histories of Africa, Australia, and North and South America.

Software development

Crossley is a software author, and has created applications for use by teachers, professors, community organizers to manage web pages. The free applications are specially designed for display of all "horizontally-written" scripts, and integrate functions needed for instant web page management. A widely used app aids students in study and memorization of the Chinese classic Daxue 大學. Other software makes this famous reference work Eminent Chinese of the Ch'ing Period used by students who do not know the Wade–Giles system accessible, and also integrates to Harvard University GIS database. It is available to the public (link) both as a web interface and as a desktop internet application.

References

Citations

Sources

External links
"China at the Center of Eurasian History" (University of Birmingham, UK, February 25, 2015)
Crossley review of Jung Chang, Empress Dowager Cixi in ''London Review of Books'
R. Kent Guy review of The Wobbling Pivot in The China Quarterly
On Internet Dialogue with Chinese Historians in China
Crossley's Errata Page
The Faculty Project
Crossley, "China's Century Long Identity Crisis, in the Wall Street Journal, 10.10.2011
Maura Dykstra, "Reflections on Qing History"
History News Network, "Historians in the News"
James A. Millward review of A Translucent Mirror in History Cooperative
Crossley, "The Late Qing Empire in Global History" in Association for Asian Studies,Education about Asia, Fall 2008
2001 Joseph Levenson Book Prize
Justin Tighe, Review of Crossley, The Manchus
Yougoubian, David N., review of G.R. Garthwaite, The Persians in International Journal of Middle East Studies, Volume 38, No.3, pp.489-491.
Giorgio Riello review of What is Global History? in  Journal of World History
Iftekhar Iqbali review of What is Global History? with Crossley response, IHR Reviews in History
Felipe Fernandez-Armesto review of What is Global History?
Liu Wenming, "Memoir of translating What is Global History? (in Chinese)'
Peter Wood review of The Wobbling Pivot in Asian Review of Books
Paul A. Cohen review of The Wobbling Pivot in China Journal
Academic device download for Daxue and Lexicon
"Seven Faculty Members Names as Society of Fellows Mentors"
Tonseth House Software Development
Software interface for Eminent Chinese

1955 births
Living people
21st-century American historians
American sinologists
Free software programmers
Dartmouth College faculty
Swarthmore College alumni
People from Lima, Ohio
American women historians
Historians of China
Women orientalists
21st-century American women